Golem Volley is an Italian women's volleyball club based in Palmi and last played in the Serie A2 in 2016–17.

Previous names
Due to sponsorship, the club have competed under the following names:
 Golem Volley (....–2015)
 Golem Software Palmi (2015–present)

History
The club has played in the lower national leagues and was promoted to Serie A2 in 2015. After two seasons at Serie A2, the club did not submit a request to participate in the 2017–18 season.

Venue
The club play its home matches at PalaSurace (also known as Palazzetto dello Sport “Mimmo Surace”) in Palmi. The venue has a 600 spectators capacity.

Team
The club last Serie A2 squad, season 2016–2017, as of March 2017.

References

External links
 Official website 

Italian women's volleyball clubs
Palmi
Province of Reggio Calabria